Denis Augustine Hanley (1903 – 10 June 1980) was a British electrical engineer and Conservative Party politician.

The son of Edmund Hanley of Kintbury, Berkshire, he was educated at Downside School and Trinity College, Cambridge.

At the 1931 general election he was elected as Conservative Party Member of Parliament for Deptford, unseating the long-serving Labour incumbent, C. W. Bowerman.

In January 1935 he was found guilty of being drunk in charge of a motor car and was disqualified from driving. When an election was called later that year he choose not to defend his seat.

From 1938-54 he was employed by the Royal Naval Scientific Service.

References

External links

1903 births
1980 deaths
Conservative Party (UK) MPs for English constituencies
UK MPs 1931–1935
People educated at Downside School
British electrical engineers
People from Kintbury
Alumni of Trinity College, Cambridge